The Onion Omega series of personal single-board computer created by a startup company called Onion that is based in Boston, Toronto and Shenzhen. It is advertised as "the world's smallest Linux Server". The system combines a tiny form factor and power-efficiency with the power of a general purpose Operating System.  They ship with a Linux kernel based lightweight operating system for embedded systems called OpenWRT, but is capable of running other lightweight Unix-based operating systems.

The first shipments of the Onion Omega went out in October, 2015.

History
Omega2 is the next generation of the old product Onion makes, Omega. The original Omega was based on the Qualcomm Atheros AR9331  (MIPS architecture) SoC which runs a full Linux operating system designed for embedded system and sold for $19.99.  The company has discontinued development of the Omega, and replaced it with the successor, Omega2, using another SoC chip - Mediatek MT7688 which also has a metal cover over the chip. They have also drastically cut the price to $5 (but later increased it to $7.5).

As of the beginning of 2017, Onion has already attracted crowdfunding of more than $850,000 for the Omega2, which has greatly exceeded their initial goal of $440,000.

Hardware Features
Omega2 comes in two versions, the basic Omega2 and Omega2 Plus.  Omega2 CPU is based on MIPS architecture running at 580 MHz clock speed, equipped with 64 MB of RAM and 16 MB of flash memory.  Omega2 Plus is similar to Omega2, except it has 128 MB RAM and 32 MB memory and a MicroSD slot, sold for $9 USD. The system comes in a small PCB footprint with dual-in-line 16x2mm pins.  The board runs at 3.3 volts with an average power consumption of 0.6W.  The devices are intended for as headless computers with no graphical interfaces in Embedded systems.

References

External links 
 Official website
 MIPS32 Architecture
 

2016 establishments in the United States
Educational hardware
Linux-based devices
MIPS architecture
Products introduced in 2016
Single-board computers